{{Taxobox
| name = Burkholderia cepacia complex
| image = Burkholderia cepacia.jpg
| domain = Bacteria
| phylum = Pseudomonadota
| classis = Betaproteobacteria
| ordo = Burkholderiales
| familia = Burkholderiaceae
| genus = Burkholderia
| species = B. cepacia complex| binomial = Burkholderia cepacia complex
| binomial_authority = (Palleroni and Holmes 1981)  Yabuuchi et al. 1993
| type_species = 
| synonyms = *Pseudomonas cepacia Burkholder 1950
 Pseudomonas multivorans Stanier et al. 1966
 Pseudomonas cepacia (ex Burkholder 1950) Palleroni and Holmes 1981
 Pseudomonas kingii Jonsson 1970
}}Burkholderia cepacia complex (BCC), or simply Burkholderia cepacia, is a group of catalase-producing, lactose-nonfermenting, Gram-negative bacteria composed of at least 20 different species, including B. cepacia, B. multivorans, B. cenocepacia, B. vietnamiensis, B. stabilis, B. ambifaria, B. dolosa, B. anthina,  B. pyrrocinia and B. ubonensis. B. cepacia is an opportunistic human pathogen that most often causes pneumonia in immunocompromised individuals with underlying lung disease (such as cystic fibrosis or chronic granulomatous disease). Patients with sickle-cell haemoglobinopathies are also at risk.  The species complex also attacks young onion and tobacco plants, and displays a remarkable ability to digest oil. Burkholderia cepacia is also found in marine environments (marine sponges) and some strains of Burkholderia cepacia can tolerate high salinity. S.I. Paul et al. (2021) isolated and biochemically characterized salt tolerant strains of Burkholderia cepacia from marine sponges of Saint Martin's Island of the Bay of Bengal, Bangladesh.

Pathogenesis
BCC organisms are typically found in water and soil and can survive for prolonged periods in moist environments. They show a relatively poor virulence. Virulence factors include adherence to plastic surfaces (including those of medical devices) and production of several enzymes such as elastase and gelatinase. Also relevant might be their ability to survive attacks from neutrophils.

Person-to-person spread has been documented; as a result, many hospitals, clinics, and camps have enacted strict isolation precautions for those infected with BCC. Infected individuals are often treated in a separate area from uninfected patients to limit spread, since BCC infection can lead to a rapid decline in lung function and result in death.

Diagnosis 
Diagnosis of BCC involves culturing the bacteria from clinical specimens, such as  sputum or blood. BCC organisms are naturally resistant to many common antibiotics, including aminoglycosides and polymyxin B. and this fact is exploited in the identification of the organism. The organism is usually cultured in Burkholderia cepacia agar (BC agar), which contains crystal violet and bile salts to inhibit the growth of Gram-positive cocci, and ticarcillin and polymyxin B to inhibit the growth of other Gram-negative bacilli. It also contains phenol red pH indicator which turns pink when it reacts with alkaline byproducts generated by the bacteria when it grows.

Alternatively, oxidation-fermentation polymyxin-bacitracin-lactose (OFPBL) agar can be used. OFPBL contains polymyxin (which kills most Gram-negative bacteria, including Pseudomonas aeruginosa) and bacitracin (which kills most Gram-positive bacteria and Neisseria species).  It also contains lactose, and organisms such as BCC that do not ferment lactose turn the pH indicator yellow, which helps to distinguish it from other organisms that may grow on OFPBL agar, such as Candida species, Pseudomonas fluorescens, and Stenotrophomonas species.

Treatment 
Treatment typically includes multiple antibiotics and may include ceftazidime, minocycline, piperacillin, meropenem, chloramphenicol, and trimethoprim/sulfamethoxazole(co-trimoxazole). Although co-trimoxazole has been generally considered the drug of choice for B. cepacia infections, ceftazidime, minocycline, piperacillin, and meropenem are considered to  be viable alternative options in cases where co-trimoxazole cannot be administered because of hypersensitivity reactions, intolerance, or resistance. Newer beta-lactam / beta-lactamase combinations like ceftazidime-avibactam or ceftolozane-tazobactam can also be effective. Burkholderia cepacia is intrinsically resistant to colistin and usually resistant to aminoglycosides.

In people with cystic fibrosis,  evidence is insufficient about the effectiveness of long-term antibiotic treatment with continuous inhaled aztreonam lysine (AZLI) in terms of lung function or chest infections.

History
B. cepacia was discovered by Walter Burkholder in 1949 as the cause of onion skin rot, and first described as a human pathogen in the 1950s. It was first isolated in patients with cystic fibrosis (CF) in 1977, when it was known as Pseudomonas cepacia. In the 1980s, outbreaks of B. cepacia in individuals with CF were associated with a 35% death rate. B. cepacia has a large genome, containing twice the amount of genetic material as E. coli.

See also
 Contamination control
 Povidone-iodine (contamination by BCC)

References

Further reading

External links
 
 Burkholderia cepacia complex in the NCBI Taxonomy Browser
 Type strain of Burkholderia cepacia complex at BacDive, the Bacterial Diversity Metadatabase
 Type strain of Burkholderia cepacia at BacDive, the Bacterial Diversity Metadatabase

Bacterial diseases
Burkholderiaceae
Healthcare-associated infections